100 Horsemen (also known as Son of El Cid) is a 1964 Italian-Spanish-German historical-adventure film directed by Vittorio Cottafavi.

In 2004 it was restored and shown as part of the retrospective "Storia Segreta del Cinema Italiano: Italian Kings of the Bs" at the 61st Venice International Film Festival.

Cast 

Mark Damon as  Don Fernando Herrera y Menendez
Antonella Lualdi as  Sancha Ordoñez
Gastone Moschin as  Frate Carmelo
Wolfgang Preiss as  Sheik Abengalbon
Barbara Frey as  Laurencia
Hans Nielsen as  Alfonso Ordoñez 
Manuel Gallardo as  Halaf 
Mario Feliciani as  Ambassador of the Sheik
Arnoldo Foà as  Don Gonzalo Herrera y Menendez 
Aldo Sambrell as  Alfaqui

References

External links

1964 films
1960s historical adventure films
Italian historical adventure films
German historical adventure films
Films directed by Vittorio Cottafavi
Spanish historical adventure films
West German films
1960s Italian-language films
Films set in the 11th century
1960s Italian films
1960s Spanish films
1960s German films